Richard Anthony McGlynn (born July 19, 1948 in Medford, Massachusetts) is a retired professional ice hockey player who played 30 regular season games in the World Hockey Association for the Chicago Cougars in 1972–73. As an amateur, he played for the Colgate University men's hockey team as well as the United States national team at the 1972 Winter Olympics and also the 1971 and 1972 Ice Hockey World Championship tournaments.

References 
 Dick McGlynn @ Massachusetts hockey
 

1948 births
American men's ice hockey defensemen
Chicago Cougars players
Colgate Raiders men's ice hockey players
Ice hockey players at the 1972 Winter Olympics
Living people
Olympic silver medalists for the United States in ice hockey
Sportspeople from Medford, Massachusetts
Ice hockey players from Massachusetts
Medalists at the 1972 Winter Olympics
Rhode Island Eagles players